A dirty kitchen is an outdoor kitchen in the Philippines, Kuwait, Bahrain and many other West Asian countries either separate from or adjoining the main house, with the reasons for its isolation or separation including fire safety, keeping the smoke and fuel smell out, and keeping charcoal dust and oil grime out.

Rural versions of the dirty kitchen have firewood-run stoves on kitchen tables literally made of dirt.

References

Kitchen
Rooms
Food and drink preparation
Architecture in the Philippines
Asian architecture